Iceland competed at the 2012 Winter Youth Olympics in Innsbruck, Austria. The Icelandic team was made up of three athletes in two sports.

Alpine skiing

Iceland qualified one boy and one girl in alpine skiing.

Boy

Girl

Cross country skiing

Iceland qualified one boy in Cross-country skiing.

Boy

Sprint

See also
Iceland at the 2012 Summer Olympics

References

Nations at the 2012 Winter Youth Olympics
2012 in Icelandic sport
Iceland at the Youth Olympics